William Mark Goldman (born 1955 in Kansas City, Missouri) is a professor of mathematics at the University of Maryland, College Park (since 1986).  He received a B.A. in mathematics from Princeton University in 1977, and a Ph.D. in mathematics from the University of California, Berkeley in 1980.

Research contributions
Goldman has investigated geometric structures, in various incarnations, on manifolds since his undergraduate thesis, "Affine manifolds and projective geometry on manifolds", supervised by William Thurston and Dennis Sullivan. This work led to work with Morris Hirsch and David Fried on affine structures on manifolds, and work in real projective structures on compact surfaces. In particular he proved that the space of convex real projective structures on a closed orientable surface of genus  is homeomorphic to an open cell of dimension . Combining this result with Suhyoung Choi's convex decomposition theorem, this led to a complete classification of convex real projective structures on compact surfaces.

Shortly thereafter he showed that the space of representations of the fundamental group of a closed orientable surface of genus  in  has  connected components, distinguished by the Euler class.

With David Fried, he classified compact quotients of Euclidean 3-space by discrete groups of affine transformations, showing that all such manifolds are finite quotients of torus bundles over the circle. The noncompact case is much more interesting, as Grigory Margulis found complete affine manifolds with nonabelian free fundamental group. In his 1990 doctoral thesis, Todd Drumm found examples which are solid handlebodies using polyhedra which have since been called "crooked planes."

Goldman found examples (non-Euclidean nilmanifolds and solvmanifolds) of closed 3-manifolds which fail to admit flat conformal structures.

Generalizing Scott Wolpert's work on the Weil–Petersson symplectic structure on the space of hyperbolic structures on surfaces, he found an algebraic-topological description of a symplectic structure on spaces of representations of a surface group in a reductive Lie group. Traces of representations of the corresponding curves on the surfaces generate a Poisson algebra, whose Lie bracket has a topological description in terms of the intersections of curves. Furthermore, the Hamiltonian vector fields of these trace functions define flows generalizing the Fenchel–Nielsen flows on Teichmüller space. This symplectic structure is invariant under the natural action of the mapping class group, and using the relationship between Dehn twists and the generalized Fenchel–Nielsen flows, he proved the ergodicity of the action of the mapping class group on the SU(2)-character variety with respect to symplectic Lebesgue measure.

Following suggestions of Pierre Deligne, he and John Millson proved that the variety of representations of the fundamental group of a compact Kähler manifold has singularities defined by systems of homogeneous quadratic equations. This leads to various local rigidity results for actions on Hermitian symmetric spaces.

With John Parker, he examined the complex hyperbolic ideal triangle group representations.  These are representations of hyperbolic ideal triangle groups to the group of holomorphic isometries of the complex hyperbolic plane such that each standard generator of the triangle group maps to a complex reflection and the products of pairs of generators to parabolics.  The space of representations for a given triangle group (modulo conjugacy) is parametrized by a half-open interval.  They showed that the representations in a particular range were discrete and conjectured that a representation would be discrete if and only if it was in a specified larger range.  This has become known as the Goldman–Parker conjecture and was eventually proven by Richard Schwartz.

Professional service
Goldman also heads a research group at the University of Maryland called the Experimental Geometry Lab, a team developing software (primarily in Mathematica) to explore geometric structures and dynamics in low dimensions. He served on the Board of Governors for The Geometry Center at the University of Minnesota from 1994 to 1996.

He served as Editor-In-Chief of Geometriae Dedicata from 2003 until 2013.

Awards and honors
In 2012 he became a fellow of the American Mathematical Society.

Publications

References

External links
Faculty page at the University of Maryland, College Park

1955 births
Living people
20th-century American mathematicians
21st-century  American  mathematicians
UC Berkeley College of Letters and Science alumni
University of Maryland, College Park faculty
Fellows of the American Mathematical Society
Topologists
Differential geometers
People from Kansas City, Missouri
Mathematicians from Missouri
Princeton University alumni